Ian Jones is a Paralympian athlete from Great Britain competing mainly in category T44 sprint events.

Ian started his athletics career running 100m & 200m but made a successful step-up to 400m in 2007. He ran then personal bests for 100m (11.88) and 200m (23.82) for two silvers behind Oscar Pistorious at 2007 Paralympic World Cup. Ian is a qualified football and disability sports coach and coaches in the Manchester and Stockport area. When he was younger, he had football trials with Manchester United and Stockport County and is a judo black belt.

He competed in the 2008 Summer Paralympics in Beijing, China where he won a bronze medal in the men's 200 metres - T44 event and a bronze medal in the men's 400 metres - T44 event.

External links
 

Paralympic athletes of Great Britain
Athletes (track and field) at the 2008 Summer Paralympics
Paralympic bronze medalists for Great Britain
British male sprinters
Year of birth missing (living people)
Living people
Medalists at the 2008 Summer Paralympics
Paralympic medalists in athletics (track and field)